Ocularia cineracea is a species of beetle in the family Cerambycidae. It was described by Karl Jordan in 1894.

Subspecies
 Ocularia cineracea aethiopica Teocchi, Jiroux & Sudre, 2004
 Ocularia cineracea cineracea Jordan, 1894
 Ocularia cineracea subcineracea Breuning, 1968

References

Oculariini
Beetles described in 1894
Taxa named by Karl Jordan